The SD Women is a women's wing in Sweden, with connection to the Sweden Democrats. It was established in October 2010.

References

External links

official website 

2010 establishments in Sweden
Organizations established in 2010
Women's wings of political parties in Sweden
Organizations based in Stockholm
Women in Stockholm